Speed limits within towns:

60 km/h
50 km/h for towing vehicles

Speed limits outside towns:

Cars and lorries weighing less than 3500 kg:

90 km/h outside towns
110 km/h on motorways

Buses and motorcycles:

90 km/h

Buses with trailers, cars with trailers, lorries with trailers, lorries weighing more than 3500 kg:

70 km/h outside towns
90 km/h on motorways

Vehicles driving by person with less than 2 years experience and vehicles used during driving lessons:

70 km/h

Lorries used for passenger transportation:

60 km/h

Towing vehicles:

50 km/h

References
Rules of the road in Belarus (English version): http://pdd.by/pdd/en/p11/

Belarus
Transport in Belarus

100 and 120 ( car weight less than 3500)